Fetish is a compilation album by Joan Jett and the Blackhearts, released on June 8, 1999.

Fetish contains three originals-- two versions of the title track, and "Baby Blue," written with Kathleen Hanna of Bikini Kill. A live version of the Runaways' "Black Leather" was not on the original pressing of Fetish, but was added to later pressings. "Do You Wanna Touch Me" is also live. The Rolling Stones classic "Star Star," originally a hidden track on the cassette tape version of Album, is also included.

Track listing

References

Joan Jett compilation albums
1999 compilation albums
Blackheart Records albums
Mercury Records compilation albums